Daphne Letitia Smith was the first African-American woman to earn a Ph.D. in mathematics at the Massachusetts Institute of Technology (MIT), in 1985. She is the president of the National Alumnae Association of Spelman College, her alma mater, and a member of Spelman's Board of Trustees; in 2011 she was honored with the Alumnae Association's Hall of Fame Award, "the organization’s highest honor".

Smith is originally from Ocala, Florida, and graduated from Spelman College in 1980.
At MIT, she studied probability theory as a student of Richard M. Dudley; her dissertation was Vapnik-Červonenkis Classes and the Supremum Distribution of a Gaussian Process. She taught at the University of Georgia, Georgia State University and Spelman College before turning to industry, where she has worked as a mathematician and healthcare analyst specializing in disease management.

References

External links
Daphne L. Smith, Mathematician of the African Diaspora, Scott W. Williams, State University of New York at Buffalo

Year of birth missing (living people)
Living people
People from Ocala, Florida
20th-century American mathematicians
African-American mathematicians
American women mathematicians
Probability theorists
Spelman College alumni
Massachusetts Institute of Technology School of Science alumni
University of Georgia faculty
Georgia State University faculty
Spelman College faculty
20th-century women mathematicians